The names of places in the Etosha National Park are dominated by Hai//om (42%) and Afrikaans (33%). Most of the origins of names are from a compilation by Hu Berry who was a biologist at the Etosha Ecological Institute in the Etosha National Park.

References

Etosha National Park
Etosha
Etosha